Piedras Negras may refer to:

 Piedras Negras, Coahuila, a city in the state of Coahuila, Mexico
 Piedras Negras Municipality, a municipality in Mexico, with the center in the eponymous city
 Piedras Negras (Maya site), an archaeological site of the pre-Columbian Maya civilization, located in the present-day Petén department of Guatemala
 Piedras Negras District
 Piedras Negras International Airport